'Spilomyia fusca , the Bald-faced Hornet Fly , is a fairly common species of syrphid fly first officially described by Loew, 1864 This species is found in North Eastern America. Hoverflies get their names from the ability to remain nearly motionless while in flight the  adults, also  know as flower flies for they are commonly found around and on flowers from which they get both energy-giving nectar and protein rich pollen.  The larvae are known as the  short-tailed larva taylored for moist areas such as rot holes of trees.

Distribution
Canada, United States.

References

Eristalinae
Insects described in 1864
Diptera of North America
Hoverflies of North America
Taxa named by Hermann Loew